Da'Vine Joy Randolph (born May 21, 1986) is an American actress and singer. She first gained recognition as Oda Mae Brown in the Broadway production of Ghost: The Musical (2012); she was nominated for the Tony Award for Best Performance by a Featured Actress in a Musical for her acting in this role.

Randolph's early films include The Angriest Man in Brooklyn (2014) and Office Christmas Party (2016); she acted in the television series Selfie (2014) and the television series People of Earth (2016–17). Randolph received critical acclaim for her performance as Lady Reed in the biographical film Dolemite Is My Name (2019). In 2020, Randolph starred in the romantic comedy television series High Fidelity.

Early life
Randolph grew up in Philadelphia and Hershey, Pennsylvania. She went to Temple University to focus on vocal performance, but in her junior year she decided to switch concentrations to musical theatre. After graduating from Temple she went to the Yale School of Drama. She graduated from Yale in 2011 with her master's degree.
As a youth she attended Interlochen Arts Camp, studying theatre.

Career
Randolph auditioned for an understudy role in the Broadway transfer of Ghost the Musical (which was currently playing in London's West End), but the producers decided to cast her in the principal role of Oda Mae Brown. Before the casting of the Broadway transfer was announced Sharon D. Clarke, who played Oda Mae in the London run of Ghost the Musical, suffered a minor knee injury. Randolph was quickly flown to London to cover the role in Clarke's absence. Her debut performance took place on Friday December 16, 2011 and she continued to share the role with understudy Lisa Davina Phillip until early January 2012, when Clarke returned.

After a preview period that began in March 2012, the Broadway production opened Monday April 23, 2012 with Randolph playing opposite Richard Fleeshman and Caissie Levy in the leading roles. She was nominated for the Tony Award for Best Featured Actress in a Musical.

Randolph played Charmonique in ABC's situation comedy series Selfie, which premiered on September 30, 2014.

Randolph did voiceover for the role of Christine in the Netflix original series The Mr. Peabody & Sherman Show.

Filmography

Film

Television

Theatre

Awards and nominations

References

External links
 
 
 

Living people
American film actresses
American television actresses
American voice actresses
American musical theatre actresses
American stage actresses
Temple University alumni
Yale School of Drama alumni
1986 births
African-American actresses
American women singers
Actresses from Pennsylvania
People from Hershey, Pennsylvania
20th-century African-American women singers
21st-century African-American people
21st-century African-American women
Singers from Pennsylvania